The 2021 IMSA SportsCar Championship was the 51st racing season sanctioned by the International Motor Sports Association (IMSA) which traces its lineage back to the 1971 IMSA GT Championship. This was also the eighth United SportsCar Championship season and sixth under the WeatherTech SportsCar Championship name. The series began on January 30 with the 24 Hours of Daytona, and ended on November 13 with the Petit Le Mans after 12 races.

Classes 
 Daytona Prototype international (DPi)
 Le Mans Prototype 2 (LMP2)
 Le Mans Prototype 3 (LMP3)
 GT Le Mans (GTLM)
 GT Daytona (GTD)

For the 2021 season, a new class is set to join the class hierarchy: Le Mans Prototype 3 (LMP3), in an attempt to bolster the number of entries across each race.
It is a new addition to the structure of the WeatherTech SportsCar Championship, having previously been the main class in one of the championships' feeder series, the IMSA Prototype Challenge.

Rule changes

Sporting regulations 
On September 9, 2020, IMSA announced a revamp of their points system. For the 2021 season onward, the existing points system would be used for the results of qualifying, with the same points system being multiplied by 10 for the main race. In addition, the existing amateur-based classes (LMP2 and GTD) would have a revised qualifying structure, with the session being split into two halves, with both halves requiring a different driver and set of tires to be used for qualifying. This format would be applied to the incoming LMP3 class as well.

Schedule 
The provisional schedule was released on September 9, 2020, and features 12 rounds.  The schedule was pending, however, because of COVID-19 regulations that may still be in effect.

On December 3, 2020, IMSA announced the addition of the "Motul Pole Award 100", a qualifying race run in conjunction with the "Roar Before the Rolex 24" preseason test. The 100-minute event awards qualifying points and sets the starting order for the Rolex 24 at Daytona. Two drivers must compete in each car, however points are awarded to all drivers on the entry list for each car. This effectively made participation in the Roar Before the 24 test mandatory for all teams planning to race in the 24 Hours of Daytona.

On December 17, 2020, IMSA announced an adjustment to the schedule due to the ongoing COVID-19 pandemic, shifting the "West Coast Swing" rounds at WeatherTech Raceway Laguna Seca and the Long Beach street circuit from April to September.

On March 4, 2021, IMSA announced a further change to the schedule, again because of the pandemic, because the 24 Heures du Mans was rescheduled to August 21–22. The round at VIR, which clashed with the rescheduled Le Mans date, was moved from August 22 to October 9, while the season-ending Petit Le Mans shifted from October 9 to November 13.

In a related change on March 25, 2021, the Detroit round, initially scheduled for June 5 with the classes not at Le Mans attending, was moved back after the date shift for Le Mans, with the round shifted to June 12 and becoming a single meeting with INDYCAR. The LMP2 class was dropped from the event, with a replacement venue to be announced at a later date. The GTLM class was added, but will not score points towards the championship.

In a fourth pandemic-related change on April 7, 2021, IMSA announced the cancellation of the event at Canadian Tire Motorsport Park because of Canadian quarantine restrictions, replacing it with a standard-distance (three hour race, 2 hours, 40 minutes of racing format) at Watkins Glen International on Friday, July 2, dubbed the "WeatherTech 240 at The Glen."   The race will use the format intended for Mosport, with all classes competing;  however the GTD class will score points only towards the WeatherTech Sprint Cup.

Notes

Entries

Daytona Prototype international (DPi)

Le Mans Prototype 2 (LMP2) 
In accordance with the 2017 LMP2 regulations, all cars in the LMP2 class use the Gibson GK428 V8 engine.

Le Mans Prototype 3 (LMP3) 
In accordance with the 2020 LMP3 regulations, all cars in the LMP3 class use the Nissan VK56DE 5.6L V8 engine.

GT Le Mans (GTLM)

GT Daytona (GTD)

Race results 
Bold indicates overall winner.

Championship standings

Points systems 
Championship points are awarded in each class at the finish of each event. Points are awarded based on finishing positions in qualifying and the race as shown in the chart below.

 Drivers points

Points are awarded in each class at the finish of each event.

 Team points

Team points are calculated in exactly the same way as driver points, using the point distribution chart. Each car entered is considered its own "team" regardless if it is a single entry or part of a two-car team.

 Manufacturer points

There are also a number of manufacturer championships which utilize the same season-long point distribution chart. The manufacturer championships recognized by IMSA are as follows:

 Daytona Prototype international (DPi): Engine & bodywork manufacturer
 GT Le Mans (GTLM): Car manufacturer
 GT Daytona (GTD): Car manufacturer

Each manufacturer receives finishing points for its highest finishing car in each class. The positions of subsequent finishing cars from the same manufacturer are not taken into consideration, and all other manufacturers move up in the order.

 Example: Manufacturer A finishes 1st and 2nd at an event, and Manufacturer B finishes 3rd. Manufacturer A receives 35 first-place points while Manufacturer B would earn 32 second-place points.

 Michelin Endurance Cup

The points system for the Michelin Endurance Cup is different from the normal points system. Points are awarded on a 5–4–3–2 basis for drivers, teams and manufacturers. The first finishing position at each interval earns five points, four points for second position, three points for third, with two points awarded for fourth and each subsequent finishing position.

At Rolex 24 at Daytona, points are awarded at 6 hours, 12 hours, 18 hours and at the finish. At the Sebring 12 hours, points are awarded at 4 hours, 8 hours and at the finish. At the Watkins Glen 6 hours, points are awarded at 3 hours and at the finish. At the Petit Le Mans (10 hours), points are awarded at 4 hours, 8 hours and at the finish.

Like the season-long team championship, Michelin Endurance Cup team points are awarded for each car and drivers get points in any car that they drive, in which they are entered for points. The manufacturer points go to the highest placed car from that manufacturer (the others from that manufacturer not being counted), just like the season-long manufacturer championship.

For example: in any particular segment manufacturer A finishes 1st and 2nd and manufacturer B finishes 3rd. Manufacturer A only receives first-place points for that segment. Manufacturer B receives the second-place points.

Drivers' Championships

Standings: Daytona Prototype International (DPi)

Standings: Le Mans Prototype 2 (LMP2) 

†: Post-event penalty. Car moved to back of class.

‡: Points count towards Michelin Endurance Cup championship only

Standings: Le Mans Prototype 3 (LMP3) 

‡: Points count towards Michelin Endurance Cup championship only

Standings: Grand Touring Le Mans (GTLM) 

‡: Non-points event

Standings: Grand Touring Daytona (GTD) 

†: Post-event penalty. Car moved to back of class.

‡: Points count towards WeatherTech Sprint Cup championship only.

Team's Championships

Standings: Daytona Prototype International (DPi) 

†: Post-event penalty. Car moved to back of class.

Standings: Le Mans Prototype 2 (LMP2) 

†: Post-event penalty. Car moved to back of class.

‡: Points only awarded towards Michelin Endurance Cup championship

Standings: Le Mans Prototype 3 (LMP3) 

‡: Points count towards Michelin Endurance Cup championship only

Standings: Grand Touring Le Mans (GTLM) 

‡: Non-points event

Standings: Grand Touring Daytona (GTD) 

†: Post-event penalty. Car moved to back of class.

‡: Points count towards WeatherTech Sprint Cup championship only.

Manufacturer's Championships

Standings: Daytona Prototype International (DPi)

Standings: Grand Touring Le Mans (GTLM) 

‡: Non-points event

Standings: Grand Touring Daytona (GTD) 

‡: Points count towards WeatherTech Sprint Cup championship only.

Trueman/Akin Awards 
The Trueman / Akin Driver Award programs recognize outstanding Drivers in the LMP2, and GTD classes who, while not professional Drivers, have established themselves and their driving credentials in the racing community through their talent, effort and determination. These awards are presented to those Drivers based on their individual performance, the performance of their Teams and their driving contribution to the Race result of their Car.

The Trueman / Akin programs are intended for Drivers that have built a career outside of racing and contribute a substantial portion of the funding to a Team's budget. These Drivers may become Race winners and champions but they are distinguished by the presence of a business career or other professional pursuit away from the racetrack.

Trueman points and the Jim Trueman season-end trophy are awarded to eligible LMP2 class Drivers. Akin points and the Bob Akin season-end trophy are awarded to eligible GTD class Drivers.

Standings: Jim Trueman Award

Standings: Bob Akin Award

References

External links 

 
WeatherTech SportsCar Championship seasons
IMSA SportsCar Championship